Mouraye is a sub-prefecture of Salamat Region in Chad.

References 

Populated places in Chad